Léon Huybrechts (11 February 1876 – 9 February 1956) was a Belgian sailor and Olympic champion. He competed at the 1924 Summer Olympics in Paris, where he won a gold medal in the French National Monotype 1924. He won silver medals in the 6 m class in 1908 and 1920.

References

External links
 Profile at The Olympic Medallists
 

1876 births
1956 deaths
Belgian male sailors (sport)
Sailors at the 1908 Summer Olympics – 6 Metre
Sailors at the 1920 Summer Olympics – 6 Metre
Sailors at the 1924 Summer Olympics – Monotype
Sailors at the 1924 Summer Olympics – 6 Metre
Sailors at the 1928 Summer Olympics – 12' Dinghy
Olympic sailors of Belgium
Olympic gold medalists for Belgium
Olympic medalists in sailing
Medalists at the 1908 Summer Olympics
Medalists at the 1920 Summer Olympics
Medalists at the 1924 Summer Olympics
Olympic silver medalists for Belgium
20th-century Belgian people